Newmains railway station served the village of Newmains, North Lanarkshire, Scotland from 1867 to 1930 on the Cleland to Morningside Line.

History 
The station opened on 15 May 1867 by the Caledonian Railway. To the north was the goods yard and the signal box, which opened with the station in 1867 and to the south was Coltness Iron Works. The station closed on 1 January 1917 but reopened on 2 June 1919, before closing permanently on 1 December 1930.

References

External links 

Disused railway stations in North Lanarkshire
Former Caledonian Railway stations
Railway stations in Great Britain opened in 1867
Railway stations in Great Britain closed in 1917
Railway stations in Great Britain opened in 1919
Railway stations in Great Britain closed in 1930
1867 establishments in Scotland
1930 disestablishments in Scotland